Karşıyaka is the name of several localities in Turkey. These are;

Places
 Karşıyaka, a large metropolitan district of İzmir, Turkey
 Karşıyaka, Adana, a quarter in Adana, Turkey
 Karşıyaka, Adilcevaz, a village
 Karşıyaka, Bartın, a village in Bartın, Turkey
 Karşıyaka, Çubuk, a village in Çubuk District of Ankara Province, Turkey 
 Karşıyaka, Kozluk, a village in Kozluk District of Batman Province, Turkey
 Karşıyaka, Merzifon, a village in Merzifon District of Amasya Province, Turkey

Other uses
 Karşıyaka Arena, an indoor arena in İzmir, Turkey homr to Pınar Karşıyaka and Karşıyaka Women's Volleyball Team. 
 Karşıyaka Cemetery, the largest cemetery in Ankara, Turkey
 Karşıyaka (İZBAN), historic railway station on İZBAN's Northern Line, in the Karşıyaka district of İzmir, Turkey
 Karşıyaka S.K., Turkish sports club from Izmir, Turkey
 Karşıyaka Tram, a tram line in Karşıyaka, İzmir, Turkey
 Karşıyaka Women's Volleyball Team, women's volleyball team of Karşıyaka S.k. in İzmir, Turkey
 Pınar Karşıyaka, basketball team of Karşıyaka S.k. in İzmir, Turkey